Michele Antonio Vibò (1630–1713) was a Roman Catholic prelate who served as Archbishop of Turin (1690–1713) and Apostolic Internuncio to France (1667–1668 and 1671–1672).

Biography
Michele Antonio Vibò was born in Turin, Italy on 27 September 1630.
He was ordained a deacon on 20 December 1654 and ordained a priest on 21 December 1654.
In April 1667, he was appointed during the papacy of Pope Alexander VII as Apostolic Internuncio to France; he resigned in March 1668.
In July 1671, he was again appointed during the papacy of Pope Clement X as Apostolic Internuncio to France; he resigned in June 1672.
On 27 November 1690, he was appointed during the papacy of Pope Alexander VIII as Archbishop of Turin.
On 16 December 1690, he was consecrated bishop by Gasparo Carpegna, Cardinal-Priest of Santa Maria in Trastevere. 
He served as Archbishop of Turin until his death on 13 February 1713.

While bishop, he was the principal co-consecrator of Michel-Gabriel Rossillon de Bernex, Bishop of Genève (1697).

References

External links and additional sources
 (for Chronology of Bishops) 
 (for Chronology of Bishops) 
 (for Chronology of Bishops) 
 (for Chronology of Bishops) 

17th-century Italian Roman Catholic archbishops
Bishops appointed by Pope Alexander VII
Bishops appointed by Pope Clement X
Bishops appointed by Pope Alexander VIII
1630 births
1713 deaths
Apostolic Nuncios to France